Khan Bahadur Khan Rohilla (1823 – 24 February 1860) was the grandson of Hafiz Rahmat Khan, who was the Nawab of Rohilkhand in Uttar Pradesh. He formed his own government in Bareilly in the 1857 Indian revolt against the British rule. During the Indian Rebellion of 1857, Bareilly, too, was captured by the British. Rohilla escaped to Nepal where the Nepalese captured him and turned him over to the British. Khan Bahadur Khan Rohilla was tried, sentenced to death, and hanged in the Kotwali (Police Station) on 24 February 1860.

References

Rohilla
History of Uttar Pradesh
1823 births
1860 deaths
Indian people of Pashtun descent
Revolutionaries of the Indian Rebellion of 1857
People executed by British India by hanging